A telephone directory, commonly called a telephone book, telephone address book, phonebook, or the white and yellow pages, is a listing of telephone subscribers in a geographical area or subscribers to services provided by the organization that publishes the directory. Its purpose is to allow the telephone number of a subscriber identified by name and address to be found.

The advent of the Internet and smartphones in the 21st century greatly reduced the need for a paper phone book. Some communities, such as Seattle and San Francisco, sought to ban their unsolicited distribution as wasteful, unwanted and harmful to the environment.

The slogan "Let Your Fingers Do the Walking" refers to use of phone books.

Content 
Subscriber names are generally listed in alphabetical order, together with their postal or street address and telephone number.  In principle every subscriber in the geographical coverage area is listed, but subscribers may request the exclusion of their number from the directory, often for a fee; their number is then said to be "unlisted" (US and Canada), "ex-directory" (British English), or "private" (Australia and New Zealand).

A telephone directory may also provide instructions: how to use the telephone service, how to dial a particular number, be it local or international, what numbers to access important and emergency services, utilities, hospitals, doctors, and organizations who can provide support in times of crisis. It may also have civil defense or emergency management information. There may be transit maps, postal code/zip code guides, international dialing codes or stadium seating charts, as well as advertising.

In the US, under current rules and practices, mobile phone and voice over IP listings are not included in telephone directories.  Efforts to create cellular directories have met stiff opposition from several fronts, including those who seek to avoid telemarketers.

Types 
A telephone directory and its content may be known by the colour of the paper it is printed on.
 White pages generally indicates personal or alphabetic listings.
 Yellow pages, golden pages, A2Z, or classified directory is usually a "business directory", where businesses are listed alphabetically within each of many classifications (e.g., "lawyers"), almost always with paid advertising.
 Grey pages, sometimes called a "reverse telephone directory", allowing subscriber details to be found for a given number. Not available in all jurisdictions.  (These listings are often published separately, in a city directory, or under another name, for a price, and made available to commercial and government agencies.)

Other colors may have other meanings; for example, information on government agencies is often printed on blue pages or green pages.

Publication
Telephone directories can be published in hard copy or in electronic form. In the latter case, the directory can be on physical media such as CD-ROM, or using an online service through proprietary terminals or over the Internet.

In many countries directories are both published in book form and also available over the Internet. Printed directories were usually supplied free of charge.

CD ROM
Selectphone (ProCD) Inc.) and PhoneDisc (Digital Directory Assistance Inc) were among the earliest such proucts. These were not a matter of a single click: PhoneDisc, depending on the mix of Residential, Business or both, involved up to eight CD-ROMs. SelectPhone is fewer CD-ROMs: five.

Both provide a reverse lookup feature (by phone number or by address), albeit involving up to five CD-ROMs.

Internet
The combination of phone number lookups, along with Internet access, was offered by some service providers; VoIP (Voice over IP) was an additional feature.

History

Telephone directories are a type of city directory. Books listing the inhabitants of an entire city were widely published starting in the 18th century, before the invention of the telephone.

The first telephone directory, consisting of a single piece of cardboard, was issued on 21 February 1878; it listed 50 individuals, businesses, and other offices in New Haven, Connecticut that had telephones. The directory was not alphabetized and no numbers were associated with the people included in it. In 1879, Dr. Moses Greeley Parker suggested the format of the telephone directory be changed so that subscribers appeared in alphabetical order and each telephone be identified with a number. Parker came to this idea out of fear that Lowell, Massachusetts's four operators would contract measles and be unable to connect telephone subscribers to one another.

The first British telephone directory was published on 15 January 1880 by The Telephone Company. It contained 248 names and addresses of individuals and businesses in London; telephone numbers were not used at the time as subscribers were asked for by name at the exchange. The directory is preserved as part of the British phone book collection by BT Archives.

The Reuben H. Donnelly company asserts that it published the first classified directory, or yellow pages, for Chicago, Illinois, in 1886.

In 1938, AT&T commissioned the creation of a new typeface, known as Bell Gothic, the purpose of which was to be readable at very small font sizes when printed on newsprint where small imperfections were common.

In 1981, France became the first country to have an electronic directory on a system called Minitel. The directory is called "11" after its telephone access number.

In 1991, the U.S. Supreme Court ruled (in Feist v. Rural) that telephone companies do not have a copyright on telephone listings, because copyright protects creativity and not the mere labor of collecting existing information.

In 1996, the first telephone directories went online in the US. Yellowpages.com and Whitepages.com both saw their start in April. In 1999, the first online telephone directories and people-finding sites such as LookupUK.com went online in the UK. In 2003, more advanced UK searching including Electoral Roll became available on LocateFirst.com.

In the 21st century, printed telephone directories are increasingly criticized as waste. In 2012, after some North American cities passed laws banning the distribution of telephone books, an industry group sued and obtained a court ruling permitting the distribution to continue. Manufacture and distribution of telephone directories produces over 1,400,000 metric tons of greenhouse gases and consumes over 600,000 tons of paper annually.

Reverse directories

A reverse telephone directory is sorted by number, which can be looked up to give the name and address of the subscriber.

See also 
 Silent number
 City directory

References

Further reading

External links 

Phone Book of the World.com
LookupAmerica.com
 

Telephone numbers
Directories
History of the telephone
American inventions
1878 introductions